Great Gostiny Dvor is a vast department store on Nevsky Avenue in St Petersburg.

This Gostiny Dvor is not only the city's oldest shopping centre, but also one of the first shopping arcades in the world. Building works commenced in 1757 to an elaborate design by Bartolomeo Rastrelli, but that subsequently was discarded in favour of a less expensive and more functional Neoclassical design submitted by Jean-Baptiste Vallin de la Mothe (1729–1800).

Throughout the following century, Gostiny Dvor was continuously augmented, resulting in ten indoor streets and as many as 178 shops by the 20th century. By that time, the Gostiny Dvor had lost its popularity to the more fashionable Passage and New Passage, situated on the Nevsky Prospekt nearby. During the post-World War II reconstructions, its inner walls were demolished and a huge shopping mall came into being. This massive 18th-century structure received a face-lift and entered the 21st century as one of the most fashionable shopping centres in Eastern Europe. A nearby station of Saint Petersburg Metro takes its name from Gostiny Dvor.

References 
Bogdanov I.A. Bolshoi Gostiny dvor v Peterburge. SPb, 2001.

External links 
Official website of Great Gostiny Dvor in St Petersburg
Views from the upper gallery of Gostiny Dvor in St Petersburg

Shopping malls in Russia
Shopping malls established in 1785
Buildings and structures in Saint Petersburg
Nevsky Prospekt
Cultural heritage monuments of federal significance in Saint Petersburg